Sillamäe Kalevi staadion is a multi-purpose stadium in Sillamäe, Estonia.  It is currently used mostly for football matches and hosts the matches of JK Sillamäe Kalev. The stadium holds 800 people.

References

External links
 World Stadiums

Football venues in Estonia
Multi-purpose stadiums in Estonia
Buildings and structures in Ida-Viru County
Sport in Sillamäe
Athletics (track and field) venues in Estonia